Nature Reviews Earth & Environment is a monthly peer-reviewed scientific journal published by Nature Portfolio. It was established in 2020. The editor-in-chief is Graham Simpkins.

Abstracting and indexing
The journal is abstracted and indexed in:

Science Citation Index Expanded
Scopus

According to the Journal Citation Reports, the journal has a 2021 impact factor of 37.214, ranking it 2nd out of 279 journals in the category "Environmental Sciences" and 1st out of 201 journals in the category "Geosciences, Multidisciplinary".

References

External links

Nature Research academic journals
English-language journals
Earth and atmospheric sciences journals
Environmental science journals
Publications established in 2020
Monthly journals
Online-only journals
Review journals